Robert Patrick Sabourin (March 17, 1933 – July 9, 2020) was a Canadian professional ice hockey player, coach, and general manager. A left winger, he played one game in the National Hockey League (NHL), for the Toronto Maple Leafs during the 1951–52 NHL season. He later played in the minor leagues, eventually joining the Jacksonville Rockets of the Eastern Hockey League in the 1960s. He subsequently became their head coach and general manager, serving with the team until they folded in 1971. Afterward he remained in Jacksonville, where he formed an advertising company with partner Jimmy Murdock to  promote concerts, professional wrestling, and other events. He later owned the skating rink Skate World (now Jacksonville Ice) and owned another hockey team, the Jacksonville Bullets, which folded in 1996. He died on July 9, 2020.

Career statistics

Regular season and playoffs

See also
List of players who played only one game in the NHL

References

External links

1933 births
2020 deaths
Canadian ice hockey left wingers
Ice hockey people from Ontario
Jacksonville Rockets players
Kitchener Beavers (EPHL) players
Long Island Ducks (ice hockey) players
North Bay Trappers (EPHL) players
Ottawa Senators (QSHL) players
Pittsburgh Hornets players
Quebec Aces (QSHL) players
Seattle Totems (WHL) players
Sportspeople from Greater Sudbury
Springfield Indians players
Sudbury Wolves (EPHL) players
Toronto Maple Leafs players
Toronto St. Michael's Majors players
Trois-Rivières Lions (1955–1960) players
Trois-Rivières Lions (EPHL) players